Genetic Walk is an album by American jazz pianist Ahmad Jamal featuring performances recorded in 1975 and released on the 20th Century label.

Critical reception
Allmusic awarded the album 3 stars stating "Last of his albums to enjoy crossover chart activity".

Track listing
All compositions by Ahmad Jamal unless noted.
 "Genetic Walk" – 6:10
 "Spartacus Love Theme" (Alex North) – 3:45
 "Chaser" – 3:13
 "La Costa" (Natalie Cole, Linda Williams) – 5:47
 "Pablo Sierra" – 4:39
 "Bellows" – 6:45
 "Don't Ask My Neighbors" (Skip Scarborough) – 4:16
 "Time For Love" (Johnny Mandel, Paul Francis Webster) – 4:14

Personnel
Ahmad Jamal – keyboards
Calvin Keys – guitar (tracks 5 & 6)
Danny Leake – guitar (track 7)
Richard Evans – bass  (track 4, 7)
Roger Harris – bass (track 1)
John Heard – bass (tracks 2, & 5, 6 & 8)
Jamil Nasser – bass (track 3)
Steve Cobb – drums (track 4)
Frank Gant – drums (tracks 3 & 6)
Morris Jenkins – drums  (track 1, 7)
Eddie Marshall – drums  (track 2)
Harvey Mason – drums  (track 5)

References 

20th Century Fox Records albums
Ahmad Jamal albums
1975 albums